Sven Kreyer (born 14 May 1991) is a German footballer who plays as a striker for Rot-Weiß Oberhausen.

Career

Statistics

References

External links

1991 births
Living people
Bayer 04 Leverkusen II players
VfL Bochum II players
VfL Bochum players
Rot-Weiss Essen players
Rot-Weiß Oberhausen players
German footballers
2. Bundesliga players
Regionalliga players
Footballers from Düsseldorf
Association football forwards
3. Liga players